Jaime French (born November 9, 1989) is an American soccer player who played for FC Kansas City in the NWSL.

Career
In 2011, she was named the NSCAA Division III Women's Soccer Player of the Year. She was added to the roster of FC Kansas City in June 2013.

Personal life
She married Josh French in June 2012. Josh was killed in a car accident in March 2013.

References

External links
Wheaton College bio

1989 births
Living people
American women's soccer players
Wheaton College (Illinois) alumni
FC Kansas City players
National Women's Soccer League players
Women's association football forwards
21st-century American women